A list of animated feature films released in 2007

Highest-grossing animated film of the year

See also
 List of animated television series of 2007

References

 Feature films
2007
2007-related lists